Mark D. Ross (born April 4, 1966), better known by his stage name Brother Marquis, is an American rapper and member of 2 Live Crew.  He appears on all of 2 Live Crew's albums, except Back at Your Ass for the Nine-4 (1994). Ross was the last member to join the most well known line up of the group.

Early life
Ross was born in Rochester, New York on April 4, 1966. He and his mother moved from New York to Los Angeles, California when Ross was 14 years old.

Career

1983–1986 Early career, joining 2 Live Crew and the group's breakthrough
Ross released two twelve-inch singles, "Westside Storie" and "Rhythm Rock", during his high school years, as a member of the rap group, the Caution Crew, which also included the rappers Rodney-O and C Funk. These two singles were among the first 12-inch hip hop records from the West Coast.

While still residing in Southern California, Ross performed small shows with 2 Live Crew, which, at that time, consisted of rappers Fresh Kid Ice (Christopher Wong Won), Amazing Vee (Yuri Vielot), and their DJ Mr. Mixx (David Hobbs).  Hobbs noticed Ross' battle rap skills, and told Ross that if 2 Live Crew ever achieved success in the music business, Hobbs would call Ross to be a part of the group. In 1985, after finding underground success in Miami, 2 Live Crew relocated to the city at the behest of local concert promoter Luther Campbell, who would later join the group as producer, recording artist, and hype man.

Shortly after the move to Miami, the artistic direction of 2 Live Crew changed from West Coast hip hop style rap to comical, sexually explicit lyrics, and rapper Vielot left the group.  In April, 1985, Hobbs made good on his previous promise to a then 19-year old Ross, and invited Ross to join 2 Live Crew with Wong Won, Hobbs and Campbell. The first 2 Live Crew single released with Ross was "Word".

The 2 Live Crew's Gold-certified debut album, The 2 Live Crew Is What We Are (1986), exploded on the local scene. The expanding national popularity of The 2 Live Crew Is What We Are made Ross and his band mates rap superstars.

1988–1991: Best selling 2 Live Crew albums and attendant controversy 
In 1988, 2 Live Crew released their second studio album, Move Somethin'. The album was also certified Gold and featured the singles "Move Somethin'" and "Do Wah Diddy Diddy". Move Somethin''' improved on the charts from the previous album, making into #68 on the Billboard 200 and #20 on the Top R&B/Hip-Hop Albums charts.

2 Live Crew's third studio album As Nasty As They Wanna Be (1989), became the group's biggest seller, certified as Double Platinum by the Recording Industry Association of America. In 1990, the United States District Court for the Southern District of Florida ruled that the album was legally obscene; but this ruling was later overturned by the Eleventh Circuit. As Nasty As They Wanna Be is the first album in history to be deemed legally obscene.

In 1990, Ross and the 2 Live Crew released their fourth album Banned in the U.S.A., which was originally credited as Campbell's solo album featuring 2 Live Crew and in later editions credited as a 2 Live Crew album. The album included the hits "Do the Bart" and the title track. It was also the very first release to bear the RIAA-standard Parental Advisory warning sticker.  The eponymous title single was a reference to the obscenity decision from the U.S. District Court for the Southern District of Florida. Bruce Springsteen granted the group permission to interpolate his song "Born in the U.S.A." for the single.

Also in 1990, 2 Live Crew released Live in Concert, the group’s only live album, and their fifth album overall.  The album was released under the Effect label, a subsidiary label of Luke Records. The album peaked at #46 on the Top R&B/Hip-Hop Albums chart.Sports Weekend: As Nasty as They Wanna Be, Pt. 2, the fifth studio album and sixth album overall by the 2 Live Crew was released in 1991 as a sequel of As Nasty As They Wanna Be.  A clean version was also released entitled Sports Weekend: As Clean As They Wanna Be Part II and was the sequel of As Clean As They Wanna Be.  Sports Weekend: As Nasty as They Wanna Be, Pt. 2 would be the final album released by the most well known line up 2 Live Crew members (Ross, Wong Won, Campbell and Hobbs).

 1992–2003: Subsequent 2 Live Crew success, featured rapper and solo project 
In 1993, Ross and DJ Toomp formed a duo group named 2 Nazty and released one studio album, Indecent Exposure. That same year, Ross appeared as a featured rapper on Ice-T's album Home Invasion by Ice-T on the original version of "99 Problems", which was later remade into a major hit by Jay-Z. Ross filed a lawsuit against Jay-Z and Ice-T over the "99 Problems" remake. Ross claimed that he was paid just $10,000 in royalties, despite being prominently featured on the original version.

In 1994, Campbell, Wong Won, and a local Miami rapper named Verb made an album called Back at Your Ass for the Nine-4, as The New 2 Live Crew, without the involvement of Ross or Hobbs. Back at Your Ass for the Nine-4 is the last 2 Live Crew-related project to feature Campbell, and the only album released without Ross.

Ross, Wong Won and Hobbs would reunite to release the single "Hoochie Mama" for the soundtrack to the 1995 movie Friday. The soundtrack reached #1 on the Billboard 200 chart, where it held its position for two weeks, and on the Top R&B/Hip-Hop Albums chart for six weeks.

In 1996, Ross reunited with Wong Won and Hobbs under the 2 Live Crew banner to release the group's seventh studio album Shake a Lil' Somethin', whose eponymous single peaked at #11 on the Hot Rap Singles chart, The single "Do the Damn Thing" made it to #24 on the same chart, and "Be My Private Dancer" peaked at #34. It would be the last 2 Live Crew album to feature Hobbs.

In 1998, Ross, along with Wong Won, released The Real One the final 2 Live Crew album to date.  The album's single "2 Live Party" featuring KC of KC and the Sunshine Band and "Freak Nasty" peaked at #52 on the Hot R&B/Hip-Hop Songs chart and #9 on the Hot Rap Songs chart. The title single "The Real One", featuring Ice-T, peaked at #60 on the Hot R&B/Hip-Hop Songs and #9 on the Hot Rap Songs charts.

In 2003, Ross released Bottom Boi Style on the Playalistic Entertainment label, his first and only solo album to date.

2006–2010: Reforming and reuniting with 2 Live Crew

During 2006–07 Ross and Wong Won met, discussed their differences, and ultimately decided to relaunch 2 Live Crew. The duo made offers to past members (notably, Hobbs and Campbell) to re-join the group, but the offers were declined. Prior to Wong Won's death in 2017, the duo toured and released singles.

In 2010, Ross and Wong Won briefly reunited with former band mates Campbell and Hobbs as 2 Live Crew, and were honored at the 2010 VH1 Hip-Hop Honors: The Dirty South Edition awards show.

In late 2010, Ross and Wong Won released 2 Live Crew singles "I'm 2 Live" featuring rapper Mannie Fresh, "Cougar," and "Boom" featuring rapper E-40. The duo announced the pending release of an album, Just Wanna be Heard, that remains unreleased to this day.

2011–present: Current projects
In 2011, Ross was a featured guest on the single "Steak & Mash Potatoes" by Chain Swangaz. A music video of the single featured Ross and Chain Swangaz as fast food employee who create havoc while their boss, played by Charlie Sheen, is gone.

In 2014, Ross and Wong Won released the single "Take It Off," of which a music video was made with cameos by rappers Flo Rida, Trick Daddy, Trina, Mannie Fresh, and Flavor Flav. Later that year, Wong Won and Ross made cameo appearances in the Flo Rida music video "G.D.F.R."  That same year, the duo also announced the pending release of a new 2 Live Crew studio album Turn Me On, which remains unreleased.

In late 2014, Ross and Wong Won reunited with Campbell as the 2 Live Crew for a series of shows through the following year, 2015.

In 2016, shortly after Wong Won left 2 Live Crew for the final time, Ross reunited with Hobbs to reform the group.  The duo released two singles How Bout Dem Cowboys and One Horse Sleigh in 2016 and continue to tour nationally as 2 Live Crew.

Personal
Ross is an avowed born again Christian, but feels no moral restrictions performing sexually explicit lyrics in 2 Live Crew hits on tour or on recordings.

In 2012, Ross uploaded two videos to his YouTube channel of him performing stand up comedy. In a 2015 YouTube'' interview, Ross stated that he was pursuing the goal of being a comic and that he has a daughter.

References

1966 births
21st-century African-American people
20th-century African-American people
Living people
American male rappers
African-American male rappers
Rappers from Los Angeles
Rappers from Miami
Rappers from New York (state)
East Coast hip hop musicians
Southern hip hop musicians
West Coast hip hop musicians
People from Rochester, New York